William "Big Billy" D'Elia (born June 24, 1946) is a former Pennsylvania mobster and was the boss of the Bufalino crime family.

Background
D'Elia began working with the Bufalino family in the late 1960s as boss Russell Bufalino's driver. D'Elia's business background in solid waste brokering and other areas would later be useful in making contacts in New York, Philadelphia, and Pittsburgh. Rising through the ranks, D'Elia was said to be a mediator among mob families, meeting frequently with mobsters from the Philadelphia crime family, Western Pennsylvania, and New York City. 

Succeeding Edward Sciandra in 1994, D'Elia expanded the organization into legitimate operations such as waste management and controlling shares of Spanel Transportation and the Newcastle Group, the latter of which is a suspected money laundering operation.

In 1990, Bufalino was implicated in a money laundering operation involving The Metro, a newspaper in Exeter, Pennsylvania. The Internal Revenue Service (IRS) charged that over $3.0 million in drug and prostitution money was hidden as revenue from fictional Metro newspaper ads and subscriptions. The Metro closed in 1998.

Prosecution and prison
On May 31, 2001, IRS agents, US Postal Service Inspectors, and Pennsylvania State Police obtained search warrants for the homes of several Bufalino crime family members, including D'Elia and his mistress. The agents seized records relevant to a tax evasion investigation from which D'Elia claimed a loss of $6 million while reporting $8,000 in gambling operations in Atlantic City, New Jersey. On February 26, 2003, the New Jersey Casino Control Commission banned D'Elia from entering any Atlantic City, New Jersey casinos and he remains on the Exclusion List of the New Jersey Division of Gaming Enforcement.

On May 31, 2006, D'Elia was indicted on federal charges of laundering $600,000 in illegal drugs proceeds. When D'Elia learned that a co-conspirator might testify against him, D'Elia allegedly plotted to kill him. In August 2006, D'Elia unwittingly told an informant that he would give him photographs of a prosecution witness and later signal him to kill the man. In November 2006, D'Elia was charged with trying to kill a witness and with new charges of money laundering.

On March 12, 2008, D'Elia pleaded guilty to reduced charges of money laundering, conspiracy, and witness tampering. As part of a plea agreement, prosecutors dropped the 2008 indictments. In an attempt for leniency, D'Elia testified to a Dauphin County grand jury that indicted Mount Airy Casino Resort owner Louis DeNaples for perjury to the Pennsylvania Gaming Control Board.

D'Elia was released from prison in February 2013.

Personal life 
As of 2008, D'Elia lived in Hughestown, Pennsylvania with his wife Ellen Ward D'Elia. They have three children: a son, Russell (named after Bufalino), and two daughters, Carolyn (named after Bufalino's wife), and Miriam, an attorney in Philadelphia.

See also
List of Italian American mobsters
List of crime bosses convicted in the 21st century

References

Further reading
Capeci, Jerry. The Complete Idiot's Guide to the Mafia. Indianapolis: Alpha Books, 2002. 
Pennsylvania Crime Commission. St. Davids, Pennsylvania: DIANE Publishing, 1984.  
Sifakis, Carl. The Mafia Encyclopedia. New York: Da Capo Press, 2005. 
Sifakis, Carl. The Encyclopedia of American Crime. New York: Facts on File Inc., 2001.

External links
Scranton priest indicted for perjury
Scranton priest takes leave pending outcome of charges.  
Citizens Voice: D’Elia indicted for money laundering by Erin L. Nissley and Chris Birk, article on the 5/31/06 indictment
Reputed northeastern Pa. mobster accused of money laundering
 The Times-Tribune.com  Pavlico sentencing postponed pending testimony in trials by Erin L. Nissly

 

1946 births
Living people
People from Trenton, New Jersey
American gangsters of Italian descent
American crime bosses
American money launderers
Bufalino crime family